Lüdi is a Swiss surname. Notable people with the surname include:

 Fritz Lüdi, Swiss bobsledder
 Heinz Lüdi (born 1958), Swiss football player
 Sanna Lüdi (born 1986), Swiss skier
 Werner Lüdi (1936–2000), Swiss musician and author

See also
 Ludi

Surnames of Swiss origin